The Locate Creek Bridge, located on N. Locate Rd. near Miles City, Montana, is a historic bridge that is listed on the National Register of Historic Places.  It is significant as the oldest steel stringer bridge in the state of Montana.

It was built in 1901 by Custer County.  The bridge was part of a Custer County program to build bridges to bring farmers and ranchers into convenient reach of railroads.

The significance of the bridge was recognized by local, state, and national officials of historic registers, culminating in it being listed on the National Register on March 26, 2012.  It was listed, along with three others on that day, as part of a Multiple Property Submission, Montana's Steel Stringer and Steel Girder Bridges MPS.

From information available, it seems the bridge is located three miles north along N. Locate Road, which seems to be the road also known as Mizpah Road, north from U.S. 12, east of Miles City.

References

External links 
Photo of a truss bridge near the community of Locate, nearby but not the Locate Creek Bridge

Road bridges on the National Register of Historic Places in Montana
Bridges completed in 1901
National Register of Historic Places in Custer County, Montana
Steel bridges in the United States
Beam bridges in the United States
Transportation in Custer County, Montana